Get That Paper is a collaborative album by Daz Dillinger and rap group Fratthouse, formed by G.B. (the son of RBX) and E-Money (the cousin of Snoop Dogg).

Track listing
 "Get That Paper" (3:31)
 "Wood Grain" (2:57)
 "Give It Up Fucc" (3:04)
 "I Just Wanna Fucc" (3:44)
 "Ride Wit Me" (4:13)
 "Push It 2 The Limit" (4:56)
 "Goin Head Up" (3:33)
 "You Gonna Want Me" (5:00)
 "We Stay High" (4:42)
 "Let Me Be Yo Nigga" (4:17)
 "Survive" (4:46)

2009 albums
Daz Dillinger albums
Collaborative albums